Simon Hansen (born 30 June 1998) is a Danish athlete. He competed in the men's 4 × 100 metres relay event at the 2020 Summer Olympics.

References

External links
 

1998 births
Living people
Danish male sprinters
Athletes (track and field) at the 2020 Summer Olympics
Olympic athletes of Denmark
Place of birth missing (living people)
European Games competitors for Denmark
Athletes (track and field) at the 2019 European Games